Beryl Elaine Jacka  (9 June 1913 – 27 December 1989) was a private secretary for the Australasian Institute of Mining and Metallurgy (AUSIMM) (1948-1976) and executive officer at Australian Academy of Technological Sciences in 1976–1989. The Beryl Jacka Award was founded in her honour.

Beryl Jacka joined the AusIMM as a typist in 1936 and became acting secretary in 1945. She was officially appointed secretary in 1948 and over the next 28 years she played a vital role in the Institute's growth from 1200 members in 14 branches to 6500 in 35 branches.

Jacka regularly visited Institute branches and attended overseas congresses. As secretary she reported to the AusIMM Council – the precursor to the modern AusIMM Board – and she was a trusted source of wisdom for many Institute presidents.

On her retirement in 1976, AusIMM President C H Martin praised 'the concentration, the search for perfection, and the originality of ideas which characterise Miss Jacka's services' in awarding her honorary membership of the Institute – a remarkable tribute in a then male-dominated profession.

The Institute's 'Beryl Jacka Award' was established in 1993 to recognise members who, like Beryl, 'demonstrated extraordinary and sustained service to the AusIMM.'

References

1913 births
1989 deaths
Recipients of the Medal of the Order of Australia
20th-century Australian women
People from Hawthorn, Victoria